Saint Peter and Paul Cathedral is a Russian Orthodox church located in Karlovy Vary, Czech Republic. It is the largest and most important Orthodox church in the country.

History 
The current church was designed back in 1893, by local architect Gustav Wiedermann, as a replacement for substandard orthodox chapel, located in Mariánskolázeňská street, funded by local Russian and Serbian nobility and entrepreneurs, construction started later that year, design of The Church of Holy Trinity in Ostankino, (Храм Троицы Живоначальной в Останкине), in Moscow was used as pattern.
The church was consecrated on 9 June 1897 in the name of the holy apostles Peter and Paul.

Recent development 
In 2016, the church went through extensive renovations equal to worth of nearly 3.2 million $.

References

Further reading
 Gnirs, A.: Topographie der historischen und kunstgeschichtlichen Denkmäle in dem Bezirke Karlsbad, Prague 1933, 58

External links 

Buildings and structures in Karlovy Vary
Churches in the Czech Republic
Russian Orthodox cathedrals
Churches completed in 1893
19th-century religious buildings and structures in the Czech Republic